Amerila alberti is a moth of the subfamily Arctiinae first described by Walter Rothschild in 1910. It is found in the Australian state of Queensland.

The adults have translucent white wings. They have black spots on the thorax, a red abdomen, and red and orange areas on the legs.

References

Moths described in 1910
Amerilini
Moths of Australia